Scopula axiata  is a moth of the family Geometridae. It was described by Püngeler in 1909. It is endemic to Russia.

References

Moths described in 1909
Moths of Asia
axiata
Taxa named by Rudolf Püngeler